Liu Dehai (13 August 1937 – 11 April 2020) was a Chinese pipa player. He was born in Shanghai. In 1954, he learned the instrument under Lin Shicheng's guidance, entering the Central Conservatory of Music in 1957. After graduating in 1962, Liu stayed at the conservatory, serving as a professor. In 1964 he was transferred to the China Conservatory of Music. Since 1963, he held numerous performances in China and more than 30 other countries.

Liu inherited the traditional playing skills, developing new techniques such as "manually roulade", and created new performance techniques like "double shake" and "three shake". Since 1977, he cooperated with the Boston Symphony Orchestra numerous times under the conducting of Seiji Ozawa, to render Little Sisters on the Grassland (pipa concerto), Music at Sunset Time (symphonic poem for a pipa player and a symphony orchestra) and other pieces.

Liu trained many prominent pipa musicians who later had success abroad, including Lingling Yu, Wu Man, Yang Wei, and Jie Ma.

Liu Dehai died on April 11, 2020, at the age of 82.

References

External links
A brief biography of Liu Dehai
CRC Jianian Artists: Liu Dehai
 

1937 births
2020 deaths
People's Republic of China musicians
Pipa players
Musicians from Shanghai